Owen Island in the Antarctic is a small (19 ha), circular, ice-free island lying between Round Point and Pottinger Point about 500 m off the north coast of King George Island, in the South Shetland Islands.  It was charted and named in 1935 by DI personnel on the Discovery II.

Important Bird Area
The island has been identified as an Important Bird Area (IBA) by BirdLife International because it supports a large breeding colony of about 21,000 pairs of chinstrap penguins.

See also 
 List of Antarctic and Subantarctic islands

References

Islands of King George Island (South Shetland Islands)
Important Bird Areas of Antarctica
Penguin colonies